Cwmtwrch Rugby Football Club (Welsh: Clwb Rygbi Cwmtwrch) is a Welsh rugby union team officially founded in 1890. The team colours are black and white. Their home ground is Glyncynwal Park View, Cwmtwrch. Cwmtwrch currently have a Senior XV who play in the WRU Three West Central C league and is a feeder club for the Ospreys.

Cwmtwrch also have a very promising junior section from under-7s up to under-16s. Part of the Cwmtwrch RFC junior section consists of a merge with two other local junior sections that are Cwmgors RFC and Abercrave RFC called the Valley Dragons. The youth fifteen consists of a merge with neighbouring club Cwmgors RFC simply called “Cwm”, they play in the Ospreys youth league C.Senior team coach is currently 'the Duke' Julian Phillips.

1880-1914

In 1890 an official Cwmtwrch team took the field for the first time; though it is presumed that rugby had been played in the town before this. The first ground for Cwmtwrch RFC, Glyncawl Park View, is the pitch the team still plays on today; since returning there after the Second World War.

The club's first captain was not recorded until 1903 when D.Davies held the position.

In 1909 Cwmtwrch RFC merged with neighbouring club, Cwmllynfell.

Notable former players

  Howell Lewis (4 caps)
  Tudor Williams (1 cap)
  Albert Owen (1 cap)
  Clive Rowlands (1 cap)
  Jac Morgan (1 cap)

References

Welsh rugby union teams
Sport in Powys